"Milky White Way" is a gospel standard written by Lander Coleman, who was a quartet singer for the Coleman Brothers. The song became a million-selling hit record in 1947 when the CBS Trumpeteers, a black quartet from Baltimore, recorded it. In the late 1940s the CBS Trumpeteers had a popular morning radio show over the CBS network called 7:15 A.M.! and "Milky White Way" was their theme song. Elvis Presley also recorded a version on October 30–31, 1960, at RCA's Studio B in Nashville, Tennessee. 

A version of the song was released in 2018 on the Paul Poulton album "Heaven".

References

Elvis Presley songs
1947 songs